Presidential elections were held in Chile in 1866. Carried out through a system of electors, they resulted in the election of José Joaquín Pérez as President.

Results

References

Presidential elections in Chile
Chile
1866 in Chile
Election and referendum articles with incomplete results